Kingpin is a 1985 New Zealand drama film directed by Mike Walker. It was filmed at and inspired by the residents of Kohitere Boys Training Centre in Levin, New Zealand, it follows a group of teens who are wards of the state.  It was directed by Mike Walker, who co-wrote the script with Mitchell Manuel (who also played the part of Rikihana Nathan). It was entered into the 14th Moscow International Film Festival.

Cast
 Junior Amiga as Willie Hoto
 Nicholas Rogers as Karl Stevens
 Judy McIntosh as Alison Eastwood (as Judith McIntosh)
 Jim Moriarty as Mike Herewini
 Terence Cooper as Dave Adams
 Peter McCauley as Paul Jeffries
 Wi Kuki Kaa as Mr Nathan
 Kevin J. Wilson as Len Crawford

References

External links
 

1985 films
1985 drama films
New Zealand drama films
Films about Māori people
1980s English-language films